Voinești is a commune in Dâmbovița County, Muntenia, Romania with a population of 7,200 people. It is composed of eight villages: Gemenea-Brătulești, Izvoarele, Lunca, Manga, Mânjina, Oncești, Suduleni and Voinești.

At Voinești, there is a powerful mediumwave broadcasting station with 2 masts, working on 630 kHz.

Natives
 Cătălin Grigore

References

Communes in Dâmbovița County
Localities in Muntenia